Jeong Su-nam (born 6 June 1996) is a South Korean female tennis player.

She has career-high WTA rankings of 357 in singles, achieved on 29 May 2017, and 937 in doubles, achieved on 25 July 2016. Jeong has won seven ITF Circuit singles titles in her career.

She made her WTA Tour main-draw debut at the 2017 Korea Open, where she received a wildcard alongside Park Sang-hee in the doubles tournament.

ITF finals

Singles: 9 (7 titles, 2 runner–ups)

External links
 
 

1996 births
Living people
South Korean female tennis players
Tennis players at the 2018 Asian Games
Asian Games competitors for South Korea
21st-century South Korean women